1840 in archaeology

Explorations
 John Lloyd Stephens and Frederick Catherwood explore ruins of the Maya civilization including Quiriguá, Q'umarkaj, Palenque, and Uxmal.

Publications
 Charles Roach Smith - Collectanea Antiqua, vol. 1.

Finds
Cuerdale Hoard discovered by stoneworkers in Lancashire, England.

Births

February 7 - Charles Warren, British Biblical archaeologist (d. 1927)
March 26 - George Smith, British Assyriologist (d. 1876)
August 6 - Adolph Francis Alphonse Bandelier, Swiss-born New World archaeologist (d. 1914)

See also
 List of years in archaeology
 1839 in archaeology
 1841 in archaeology

References

1840s archaeological discoveries
Archaeology by year
Archaeology